The Norwegian national wheelchair handball team is the national wheelchair handball team of Norway and is controlled by the Norwegian Handball Federation. The Sweden became third at the 2015 European Wheelchair Handball Nations’ Tournament.

Competitive record

European Wheelchair Handball Nations’ Tournament

References

External links 

EHF Team Page

National wheelchair handball teams
Handball in Norway
Handball-Wheelchair